Wainwright is an unincorporated community in northern Milton Township, Jackson County, Ohio, United States.

Unincorporated communities in Jackson County, Ohio
Unincorporated communities in Ohio